Jeff Scott Soto (born November 4, 1965) is an American rock singer of Puerto Rican descent. He is best known for being the vocalist on Yngwie Malmsteen's first two albums, and (briefly) the lead vocalist for Journey in 2006–2007. Soto also sang lead vocals in the band Eyes. He also had a long tenure as the front man of hard rock band Talisman. Currently he works as solo artist, with his self-named band SOTO and as the vocalist of super-groups W.E.T., Sons of Apollo and  Trans-Siberian Orchestra.

His style ranges from hard rock to power metal, being influenced by classic soul singers as Sam Cooke as well as Journey's Steve Perry, and Freddie Mercury of Queen.

Career
In 1982, after performing in several local cover bands, Soto recorded several songs as lead singer for the band Kanan. In 1984, Soto provided vocals for virtuoso guitarist Yngwie Malmsteen's debut album Rising Force and his next album Marching Out a year later.

Soto has performed with a wide variety of bands, including Panther, Axel Rudi Pell, Eyes, Talisman, Takara, Humanimal, Human Clay, Kryst The Conqueror, Redlist, The Boogie Knights, Soul SirkUS and Octavision. As a session musician, Soto also performed backing vocals for artists such as Lita Ford, Steelheart, Glass Tiger, House of Lords, Stryper, and Saigon Kick.

He also sang for the fictional band Steel Dragon, which featured Zakk Wylde, Jeff Pilson and Jason Bonham for the soundtrack of the movie Rock Star along with Michael Matijevic of the band Steelheart, whose second album featured Soto on background vocals.

Soto performed at the 2000 annual OIQFC 'Freddie Mercury Birthday Party' at Reading in the UK, where he performed "Dragon Attack" with Brian May. Since then, Soto has joined Queen sideman Spike Edney's band, the Spike All Stars. Soto then appeared with Brian May and Roger Taylor at the 'Hollywood Walk of Fame' bash for the Official International Queen Fan Club. In 2012 Taylor hired Soto as one of the four singers chosen for the official tribute band Queen Extravaganza. The band was formed via internet auditions and features Freddie Mercury soundalike Marc Martel. Soto and singer Yvan Pedneault were added to the lineup to augment the selected singers, in an effort to better emulate Queen songs live. However, Soto only did one tour with the group; they continued with a smaller production and line up.

Soto's solo album Damage Control was released on Frontiers Records in March 2012. His next solo album SOTO was released on January 30, 2015. The album was co-written alongside Gus G and other members of his solo band. The solo project soon morphed into a band called SOTO. In 2016, they released DIVAK on earMusic. They toured afterwards, opening for Winery Dogs in May 2016.

In 2015, Soto recorded vocals for Joel Hoekstra's 13, contributing to the album Dying to Live. Soto split vocal duties with Russell Allen on the album.
In 2018, SOTO recorded their 3rd album Origami, released in May 2019.

Soto released another solo album, Retribution in November 2017. In early 2020 he completed work on his 7th solo album as well as scheduled a live album for release in July.

2020 saw the release of 2 solo albums on Frontiers Records, "Jeff Scott Soto - Loud & Live In Milan 2019", recorded live at the annual Frontiers Rock Festival and "Wide Awake (In My Dreamland)" co-written and produced by Alessandro Del Vecchio.

Talisman
Soto was one of the founding members of Talisman in 1989. He was in the group up until their disbandment in 2007.

Talisman regrouped in December 2019 to record a tribute track for  bassist Marcel Jacob on the 10th anniversary of his death.

Journey
In 2006, Soto replaced Steve Augeri in Journey after Augeri left the tour due to an acute throat infection. After months of being a tour replacement, Soto was officially hired as the band's singer in December 2006. However, the stint was short-lived, as he was fired from the band on June 12, 2007. Soto stated on his website "it seems they wanted something different than I brought to the table. No love lost though, they know what's best for the preservation of their legacy." He later mentioned the gig did not work out because former vocalist Steve Perry was still alive and could hypothetically rejoin the band, hurting fan expectations of any replacement singers. Although he was officially introduced as the lead singer of Journey, the band has not mentioned Soto in recent lookbacks and biographies, skipping over him entirely for his replacement Arnel Pineda.

Trans-Siberian Orchestra
Soto joined Trans-Siberian Orchestra as a touring singer in 2008. Soto has continually toured with the group, stating "I will be a part of Trans-Siberian Orchestra as long as they'll have me."

W.E.T.
Alongside members of Work Of Art and Eclipse, Soto founded W.E.T. The group, named after the initials of the band involved, Soto's representing Talisman, released a self-titled debut album in November 2009. In 2013, they released their second album Rise Up, and their third studio album Earthrage followed in 2018.
They began recording a new album in 2020.

Sons of Apollo
In May 2017, he joined a progressive metal supergroup named Sons of Apollo with Derek Sherinian, bassist Billy Sheehan, drummer Mike Portnoy and guitarist Ron "Bumblefoot" Thal. Their debut album, Psychotic Symphony, was released October 20, 2017, with Inside Out/Sony.

After releasing a live album in 2019, Sons of Apollo released their second album MMXX in January 2020.

Octavision

In 2020, alongside his Sons Of Apollo co-bandmate Billy Sheehan, Soto was invited by a Glendale, California based Armenian guitarist Hovak Alaverdyan to participate in his progressive metal project Octavision. There, Soto performed vocal duties on two tracks - "Coexist" and "Apocalyptus". The album titled Coexist was released on December 29, 2020.

Personal life

Soto was born in Brooklyn, New York, his family moved to Los Angeles when he was a child. He spent his youth singing, learning trumpet and keyboards.

In 2012, he married his long-term girlfriend Elena. He has a son from a previous marriage, and two step-children.

Discography

Solo career
Studio albums
 Love Parade (1994)
 Holding On - EP (2002)
 Prism (2002)
 Lost in the Translation (2004)
 Believe in Me - EP (2006)
 Beautiful Mess (2009)
 Damage Control (2012)
 Retribution (2017)
 Wide Awake (In My Dreamland) (2020)
 The Duets Collection, Vol. 1 (2021)
 Complicated (2022)

Live albums
 JSS Live at the Gods 2002 (2003)
 Live at the Queen Convention 2003 (2004)
 One Night in Madrid (2009)
 Live at Firefest 2008 (2010)

Compilation albums
 Essential Ballads (2006)
 B-Sides (2006)

DVDs
 JSS Live at the Gods 2002 (2003)
 Live at the Queen Convention 2003 (2004)
 One Night In Madrid (2009)

with  Rising Force
 Rising Force (1984)
 Marching Out (1985)
Inspiration (1996)

Singles
 "Studio/Live '85" (1985)
 "I am a Viking"  (Japan, 1985)

DVDs
 Live In Japan '85 (2015)

with Kryst the Conqueror
 Deliver Us From Evil (1989)

with Eyes
 Eyes (1990)
 Windows Of The Soul (1993)

Singles
 "Calling All Girls" (1990)
 "Nobody Said It Was Easy" (1990)

with Talisman
Studio albums
 Talisman (1990)
 Genesis - (1993)
 Humanimal (1994)
 Humanimal Part II (1994)
 Life (1995)
 Truth (1998)
 Cats and Dogs (2003)
 7 (2006)

Live albums
 Five out of Five (Live in Japan) (1994)
 Live at Sweden Rock Festival (2001)
 Five Men Live (2005)

Compilation albums
 Best of...  (1996)
 BESTerious (1996)
 Vaults (2015)

Singles
 "Just Between Us" (1990)
 "I'll be Waiting"  (Sweden, 1990)
 "Mysterious (This Time is Serious)" (1993)
 "Time after Time" (1993)
 "Doing Time With My Baby" (1994)
 "Colour My XTC" (1994)
 "All + All" (1994)
 "Frozen" (1995)
 "Crazy" (1998)
 "Never Die (A Song For Marcel)" (2019)

DVDs
 The World's Best Kept Secret (2005)

with Axel Rudi Pell
 Eternal Prisoner (1992)
 The Ballads (1993)
 Between the Walls (1994)
 Made In Germany - Live (1995)
 Black Moon Pyramid (1996)
 Magic (1997)
 Magic Moments: 25th Anniversary Special Show - Live (2015)

Singles
 "Forever Young" (1994)
 "Cry of the Gypsy" (1994)

DVD / Blu-ray:
 Magic Moments: 25th Anniversary Special Show - Live (2015)

with Takara
 Eternal Faith (1993)
 Taste of Heaven (1995)
 Eternity: Best of 93 - 98 - Compilation (1998)
 Blind in Paradise (1998)

with Human Clay
 Human Clay (1996)
 u4ia (1997)
 Closing the Book on Human Clay (2003)
 The Complete Recordings (2015)

with Steel Dragon
 Rock Star (Music from the Motion Picture) (2001)

with Humanimal
 Humanimal (2002)
 Find My Way Home - EP (2002)

with Soul SirkUS
 World Play (2005)

with Redlist
 Ignorance (2007)

with W.E.T.
W.E.T. (2009)
Rise Up (2013)
One Live in Stockholm (2014)
Earthrage (2018)
Retransmission (2021)

Singles
 "One Love" (2009)
 "Comes Down Like Rain" (2009)
 "Brothers In Arms" (2009)
 "Learn to Live Again" (2012)
 "Love Heals" (2013)
 "Watch the Fire" (2018)
 "Big Boys Don't Cry" (2020)
 "Got to be About Love" (2020)

with Trans-Siberian Orchestra
Night Castle (2009)
Letters From the Labyrinth (2015)

with Soto
 Inside the Vertigo (2015)
 Divak (2016)
 Origami (2019)
 Revision (2020)

with  13
 Dying to Live (2015)
 Running Games (2021)

with Sons of Apollo
 Psychotic Symphony (2017)
 Alive / Tengo Vida - EP (2018)
 Live With The Plovdiv Psychotic Symphony (2019)
 MMXX (2020)

with Ellefson-Soto
 Vacation in the Underworld (2022)

Guest appearances – lead vocals
 Threshold - Threshold - 1983
 Panther - Panther - 1986
 Dragonne - On Dragons Wings - 1988
 Kuni - Lookin' For Action - 1988
 Alex Masi - Attack Of The Neon Shark - 1989
 Skrapp Mettle - Sensitive - 1991
 Rich Girl - Rich Girl: Original Soundtrack Unreleased - 1991
 Biker Mice From Mars - Biker Mice From Mars: Original Soundtrack - 1993
 Da Black Side Brown - Da Black Side Brown - 1994
 Gary Schutt - Sentimetal - 1994
 Hollywood Underground - Hollywood Underground - 1996
 Yngwie Malmsteen - Inspiration - 1996
 The Boogie Knights - Welcome To The Jungle Boogie - 1997
 Ken Tamplin And Friends  - Wake The Nations - 2003
 Chris Catena - Freak Out! - 2003
 Christian Rivel's Audiovision - The Calling - 2003
 Laudamus - Lost In Vain - 2003
 Roger Sause - Freestyle Funk - 2004
 Edge of Forever - Feeding The Fire - 2004
 Michael Schenker - Heavy Hitters - Doctor Doctor: The Kulick Sessions - By Invitation Only - 2005
 Jorge Salán - Chronicles of an Evolution - 2007
 Tempestt - Bring 'Em On - 2007
 Taka Minamino - AngelWing - 2009
 Jorge Salán - Estatuas en la calle - 2010
 Danger Angel - Danger Angel - 2010
 Jane Bogaert - Fifth Dimension - 2010
 Last Autumn's Dream – A Touch of Heaven - 2010
 "The Flames Still Burns" - from "Ballroom Hamburg — A Decade of Rock" compilation (2010)
 Pushking - The World as We Love it - 2011
 Evolution - Evolution - 2011
 Talon - III - 2011
 Mitch Malloy - II - 2011
 Wolfpakk - Wolfpakk - 2011
 Last Autumn's Dream - Nine Lives - 2011
 Koritni  - Welcome To The Crossroads - 2012
 Reign of the Architect - Rise - 2012
 AOR - The Secrets Of L.A - 2013
 The Dave K Project - Resurrection / True Lies - 2013
 Gus G - I Am The Fire - "Summer Days" - 2014
 Gus G - Brand New Revolution - 2015 
 Joel Hoekstra - Dying To Live - 2015
 AOR - L.A. Darkness - 2016
 Lita Ford - Time Capsule - 2016
 Lola Astanova - Freedom - 2016
 RTfact - Life is Good- 2017
 Brad Jurgens - Deranged- 2017
 Band of Brothers - Band of Brothers- 2017
 HighWay - "Wake Up" - 2017 
 Jason Bieler - Hope & Strife E.P. - 2018
 Jimmy Waldo & Steven Rosen - Voices From The Past - 2018
 Schubert In Rock - Commander of Pain - 2018
 Octavision - Coexist - 2020
 Black Maze Rose - Black Maze Rose (on "Laws Of Attraction") - 2020
 Jason Bieler - Songs for the Apocalypse - 2021
 Star One - Revel in Time (on "Back from the Past") - 2022

Various Artists tributes albums
 Smoke On The Water: A Tribute to Deep Purple (1994): "Hush"
 Dragon Attack: A Tribute to Queen (1996): "Save Me "
 Hot For Remixes: Tribute to Van Halen (1999): "So This Is Love (Sheep On Drugs Remix)"
 Head Soup: A Tribute to Ozzy Osbourne (2000): "Shot In The Dark"
 Little Guitars: A Tribute to Van Halen (2000): "So This Is Love" (Re-released)
 Tribute To Aerosmith: Let The Tribute Do The Talkin (2001): "Cryin'"
 An All-Star Lineup Performing The Songs of Pink Floyd (2002): "Us & Them"
 Warmth In The Wilderness: A Tribute to Jason Becker (2002): "Desert Island"
 We Salute You: A Tribute to AC/DC (2004): "Problem Child"
 Numbers from the Beast: An All-Star Salute to Iron Maiden (2004): "Aces High"
 The Sweet According to Sweden: A Tribute to The Sweet (2004): "Love Is Like Oxygen"
 24/7/365: The Tribute to Led Zeppelin (2004): "Royal Orleans"
 The Crown Jewels: A Tribute to Queen (2005): "We Will Rock You"
 80s Metal Tribute to Van Halen (2006): "So This Is Love" (Re-released)
 Butchering The Beatles (2006): "Magical Mystery Tour"

Guest appearances – backing vocals
 Rated X - Matter Of Time E.P. - 1987 (Uncredited)
 House of Lords - House of Lords - 1988
 Glass Tiger - Simple Mission - 1990
 Stryper - Against the Law - 1990
 Stryper - Can't Stop the Rock - 1991
 Saigon Kick - Saigon Kick - 1991
 Lita Ford - Dangerous Curves - 1991
 McQueen Street - McQueen Street - 1991
 Randy Jackson's China Rain - Bed of Nails - 1992
 Steelheart - Tangled in Reins - 1992
 Babylon A.D. - Nothing Sacred - 1992
 Lita Ford - Black - 1992
 Mitch Malloy - Mitch Malloy - 1992
 Slaughter - The Wild Life - 1992
 Pariah - To Mock a Killingbird - 1993
 Thomas Vikstrom - If I Could Fly - 1993
 Monster - Through The Eyes of the World - 1995
 Amalgan - Delicate Stretch of the Seems - 1997
 Paul Gilbert - Alligator Farm - 1997
 Fergie Frederiksen - Equilibrium - 1999
 Neil Turbin - Threatcon Delta - 2003
 Takara - Invitation to Forever - 2008
 Dokken - Lightning Strikes Again - 2008
 Mad Max - Here We Are - 2008
 Danger Angel - Revolutia - 2013
 Danger Angel - All The King's Horses - 2016
 Beg, Borrow & Steal - Push And Shove (The Lost Album) - 2017 (Recorded in 1991) (Uncredited)
 Ronnie Montrose - 10 x 10 - 2017: on "Still Singin' With The Band" and "I'm Not Lying"
 Harem Scarem - United - 2017
 Big Clyde - Freakin' Out - 2022

Guest songwriting
 Khymera - A New Promise  - 2005: "You Can't Take Me (Away from You)"
 Uriah Heep - Living The Dream - 2018: "Grazed By Heaven"

As producer
Spektra - Overload - 2021

References

Sources

External links
 Jeff Scott Soto official website
 Photo Gallery from JSS/Tempestt concert in Madrid 
 Interview

American heavy metal singers
American male singers
American people of Puerto Rican descent
1965 births
Living people
Talisman (band) members
Journey (band) members
Soul SirkUS members
Takara (band) members
Trans-Siberian Orchestra members
Yngwie J. Malmsteen's Rising Force members
Frontiers Records artists